Sofyan Chader (born 12 May 2000) is a French professional footballer who plays as a midfielder for Swiss club Luzern.

Career
On 3 January 2020, Chader signed a professional contract with Clermont. He made his professional debut with the club in a 1–0 Ligue 2 loss to Paris FC on 21 February 2020.

On 13 July 2021, he joined Stade Lausanne Ouchy in Switzerland on loan for the 2021–22 season.

On 11 August 2022, Chader returned to Switzerland and signed a three-year contract with Luzern.

Personal life
Born in France, Chader is of Algerian descent.

References

External links
 Clermont Foot Profile
 

2000 births
Living people
Footballers from Lyon
Association football midfielders
French footballers
French sportspeople of Algerian descent
Clermont Foot players
FC Stade Lausanne Ouchy players
FC Luzern players
Ligue 2 players
Championnat National 3 players
Swiss Challenge League players
Swiss Super League players
French expatriate footballers
Expatriate footballers in Switzerland
French expatriate sportspeople in Switzerland